The Office Depot Championship was an annual golf tournament for professional female golfers on the LPGA Tour. It took place every year from 1997 through 2005 at various sites in South Carolina (1997–2000) and in the Los Angeles, California area (2001–05).

The tournament had several named sponsors during its history. From 2001 through 2005, it was sponsored by Office Depot, a supplier of office products and services.

Tournament names through the years: 
1997: Susan G. Komen International
1998–99: City of Hope Myrtle Beach Classic
2000: Kathy Ireland Greens.com LPGA Classic
2001: The Office Depot Hosted by Amy Alcott
2002–04: The Office Depot Championship Hosted by Amy Alcott
2005: Office Depot Championship

The last tournament was held from September 30 through October 2, 2005

Winners

*The 1999 tournament was shortened to 36 holes because of rain.

Tournament record

See also
The Office Depot, another LPGA event

References

External links
LPGA official tournament microsite

Former LPGA Tour events
Golf in South Carolina
Golf in Los Angeles
Recurring sporting events established in 1997
Recurring sporting events disestablished in 2005
Women's sports in California